Joseph Willets Outerbridge (1907-1978) was a sailor from the United States, who represented his country at the 1928 Summer Olympics in Amsterdam, Netherlands.

Sources 
 

Sailors at the 1928 Summer Olympics – 6 Metre
Olympic sailors of the United States
1907 births
1978 deaths
American male sailors (sport)